A multisite cloud  is a cloud composed of several single sites (or data centers), each from the same or different providers and explicitly accessible to cloud users. In the multisite cloud environment, the tasks of a program or a workflow should be scheduled in order to achieve efficient processing.

References 

Cloud computing